In Greek mythology Ormenus or Ormenos (Ancient Greek: Ὄρμενος) is the name of eight men.

 Ormenus, one of the Telchines.
Ormenus, king of Ormenion in Thessaly and son of Cercaphus. He was the father of Amyntor and Euaemon.
Ormenus, one of the warriors in the army of the Seven against Thebes. He fell in the fighting.
 Ormenus, a Trojan warrior killed by Polypoetes during the Trojan War.
 Ormenus, a Trojan soldier slain by Teucer.
 Ormenus, father of Ctesius, king of the isle of Syra. Ctesius is the father of Eumaeus.
Ormenus, one of the Suitors of Penelope who came from Dulichium along with other 56 wooers. He, with the other suitors, was shot dead by Odysseus with the help of Eumaeus, Philoetius, and Telemachus.

Notes

References 

 Apollodorus, The Library with an English Translation by Sir James George Frazer, F.B.A., F.R.S. in 2 Volumes, Cambridge, MA, Harvard University Press; London, William Heinemann Ltd. 1921. ISBN 0-674-99135-4. Online version at the Perseus Digital Library. Greek text available from the same website.
Callimachus, Callimachus and Lycophron with an English translation by A. W. Mair ; Aratus, with an English translation by G. R. Mair, London: W. Heinemann, New York: G. P. Putnam 1921. Internet Archive
 Callimachus, Works. A.W. Mair. London: William Heinemann; New York: G.P. Putnam's Sons. 1921. Greek text available at the Perseus Digital Library.
 Homer, The Iliad with an English Translation by A.T. Murray, Ph.D. in two volumes. Cambridge, MA., Harvard University Press; London, William Heinemann, Ltd. 1924. . Online version at the Perseus Digital Library.
Homer, Homeri Opera in five volumes. Oxford, Oxford University Press. 1920. . Greek text available at the Perseus Digital Library.
 Homer, The Odyssey with an English Translation by A.T. Murray, PH.D. in two volumes. Cambridge, MA., Harvard University Press; London, William Heinemann, Ltd. 1919. . Online version at the Perseus Digital Library. Greek text available from the same website.
 Publius Papinius Statius, The Thebaid translated by John Henry Mozley. Loeb Classical Library Volumes. Cambridge, MA, Harvard University Press; London, William Heinemann Ltd. 1928. Online version at the Topos Text Project.
 Publius Papinius Statius, The Thebaid. Vol I-II. John Henry Mozley. London: William Heinemann; New York: G.P. Putnam's Sons. 1928. Latin text available at the Perseus Digital Library.
 Strabo, The Geography of Strabo. Edition by H.L. Jones. Cambridge, Mass.: Harvard University Press; London: William Heinemann, Ltd. 1924. Online version at the Perseus Digital Library.
 Strabo, Geographica edited by A. Meineke. Leipzig: Teubner. 1877. Greek text available at the Perseus Digital Library.

Kings in Greek mythology
Trojans
Suitors of Penelope
Thessalian mythology
Characters in Seven against Thebes